Tom Riley (born 5 April 1981) is an English actor, producer, and director.

Early life 
Riley was born in Maidstone, Kent, England. He became involved in drama in his hometown at the age of four, and spent his school years writing and directing plays. He attended Maidstone Grammar School. He studied English literature and drama at the University of Birmingham, graduating in 2002 with first class honours.He graduated from the University of Birmingham in Birmingham, England in 2002 and the London Academy of Music and Dramatic Art (LAMDA) in 2005. After his undergraduate studies, he formed the theater company Article 19, and while attending the LAMDA began working with the Royal Court Theatre company, appearing in the play The Woman.

Career
Riley made his Broadway debut in 2011, in a revival of Tom Stoppard's Arcadia.

Personal life
In May 2016, Riley became engaged to American actress Lizzy Caplan. They had met in January 2015 while Caplan was filming in London, and made their red carpet debut as a couple at the Prague Opera Ball in February 2016. They were married in September 2017, and their son was born in 2021.

Filmography

Film

Television

Stage

References

External links 
 

1981 births
21st-century English male actors
Alumni of the London Academy of Music and Dramatic Art
Alumni of the University of Birmingham
British male film actors
British male radio actors
British male stage actors
British male television actors
British male voice actors
English male film actors
English male radio actors
English male stage actors
English male television actors
English male voice actors
Living people
Male actors from Kent